Giorgos K. Angelopoulos (alternate spellings: Georgios, George, Aggelopoulos) (Greek: Γιώργος Κ. Αγγελόπουλος) is a Greek oil shipping and steel magnate. He is the co-owner of the men's professional club basketball team, Olympiacos, along with his brother Panagiotis Angelopoulos.

Angelopoulos family
Angelopoulos is the son of the Greek oil shipping and steel magnate Constantine Angelopoulos, and the grandson of the late Greek industrialist Panagiotis Angelopoulos (1909–2001). He is also the nephew of Theodore Angelopoulos. He is the brother of Panagiotis Angelopoulos.

Businesses
Angelopoulos, along with his brother Panagiotis, is the co-owner of Arcadia Shipmanagement Co. Ltd.

Olympiacos B.C.
Giorgos Angelopoulos and his brother, Panagiotis, won the EuroLeague Club Executive of the Year Award in the year 2012, after their professional basketball club, Olympiacos, won the EuroLeague 2011–12 season's championship.

References

External links
Olympiacos Profile

Living people
1974 births
Greek basketball chairmen and investors
Greek basketball executives and administrators
Greek businesspeople
Olympiacos B.C. presidents